Leilani Akiyama (born February 21, 1987) is an American judoka. She competed at the World Judo Championships in 2014, 2015, 2017 and 2018.

In 2020, she won the silver medal in the women's 57 kg event at the 2020 Pan American Judo Championships held in Guadalajara, Mexico.

References

External links 
 

Living people
1987 births
Place of birth missing (living people)
American female judoka
21st-century American women